Anatolie Boeştean (born 26 March 1985) is a Moldovan football player who currently is playing for Zimbru Chișinău.

External links

 http://moldova.sports.md/anatol_boestean/stats/

FC Tiraspol players
Moldovan footballers
1985 births
Living people
Place of birth missing (living people)
FC Zimbru Chișinău players
FC Dacia Chișinău players
FC Politehnica Iași (2010) players
Association football defenders